Charles Robert Moorhead (January 23, 1938 – December 3, 1986) was an American right-handed pitcher in Major League Baseball who played for the New York Mets in  and .

Biography
 
An original Met, he made his major league debut in the franchise's first official game, played on April 11, 1962 at Busch Stadium. He was one of four pitchers used by manager Casey Stengel in the 11–4 loss to the St. Louis Cardinals. In three innings, he allowed five runs (although only two were earned), on six hits and one base on balls.
 
In his two-season MLB career, Moorhead posted an 0–3 record in 47 games pitched, with 68 strikeouts and a 4.51 ERA in 119 innings. He permitted 134 hits, 47 bases on balls and 60 earned runs. He retired from baseball in 1966 and died in Lemoyne, Pennsylvania, at age 48.

References

External links

1938 births
1986 deaths
American expatriate baseball players in Canada
American expatriate baseball players in Cuba
Auburn Mets players
Austin Braves players
Austin Senators players
Baseball players from Pennsylvania
Havana Sugar Kings players
Jersey City Jerseys players
Major League Baseball pitchers
Nashville Vols players
New York Mets players
People from Chambersburg, Pennsylvania
Raleigh Mets players
Richmond Braves players
Savannah Reds players
Toronto Maple Leafs (International League) players